World population milestones went unnoticed until the 20th century, since there was no reliable data on global population dynamics.

It is estimated that the population of the world reached

Old estimates put the global population at 9 billion by 2037–2046,  after 8 billion and 10 billion by 2054–2071,  after 9 billion, with alternative scenarios ranging from a low of 7.4 billion to a high of more than 10.6 billion by the 2050s and beyond, however these milestones are likely to be reached far sooner. Projected figures vary depending on underlying statistical assumptions and which variables are manipulated in projection calculations, especially the fertility variable. Long-range predictions to 2150 range from a population decline to 3.2 billion in the 'low scenario', to 'high scenarios' of 24.8 billion. One scenario predicts a massive increase to 256 billion by 2150, assuming fertility remains at 1995 levels.

Global billionth milestones
There is no estimation for the exact day or month the world's population surpassed the one and two billion marks. The days of three and four billion were not officially noted, but the International Database of the United States Census Bureau places them in July 1960 and April 1974 respectively.

Five billion
The Day of Five Billion, 11 July 1987, was designated by the United Nations Population Fund as the approximate day on which the world population reached five billion. Matej Gašpar from Zagreb, Croatia (then SR Croatia, SFR Yugoslavia), was chosen as the symbolic 5-billionth person alive on Earth.  The honor went to Zagreb because the 1987 Summer Universiade was taking place in the city at the time.

Six billion

The United Nations Population Fund designated 12 October 1999 as the approximate day on which the world population reached six billion. It was officially designated "The Day of Six Billion". Demographers do not universally accept this date as being exact. In fact, there has been subsequent research which places the day of six billion nearer to 18 June or 19 June 1999. The International Programs division of the United States Census Bureau estimated that the world population reached six billion on 21 April 1999.  United Nations Population Fund spokesman Omar Gharzeddine disputed the date of the Day of Six Billion by stating, "The U.N. marked the '6 billionth' [person] in 1999, and then a couple of years later the Population Division itself reassessed its calculations and said, actually, no, it was in 1998."

On the Day of Six Billion, UN Secretary-General Kofi Annan was in Sarajevo, Bosnia and Herzegovina to monitor the Dayton Agreement. At midnight he went to Koševo Hospital, where Adnan Mević, born at 12.01 am, was named the symbolic 6 billionth concurrently alive person on Earth. He is the first son of Fatima Mević and Jasminko Mević and weighed 3.5 kg.

Seven billion

The "Day of Seven Billion" was targeted by the United States Census Bureau to be in March 2012, while the Population Division of the United Nations suggested 31 October 2011, and the latter date was officially designated by the United Nations Population Fund (UNFPA) as the approximate day on which the world's population reached seven billion people. United Nations Secretary General Ban Ki-moon spoke at the United Nations building in New York City on this milestone in the size of world population, and promoted the website 7 Billion Actions. Ban Ki-moon did not choose a symbolic seven billionth baby, but several groups proposed candidates: Nargis Kumar of Uttar Pradesh, India, Danica May Camacho of Manila, Philippines and Wattalage Muthumai of Colombo, Sri Lanka.

Eight billion

The "Day of Eight Billion" was targeted by the United Nations Department of Economic and Social Affairs, Population Division to be on 15 November 2022. Among babies born that day who were symbolically named as the world's eight billionth by various government agencies were: Vinice Mabansag (Tondo, Manila, Philippines); Damián Ferrera (Santo Domingo, Dominican Republic); and Arpi Kocharyan (Tsovinar, Armenia).

National and regional population

National or subnational governments have sometimes made similar designations based on the date estimated by a demographic agency. Some national milestones relate to citizens rather than residents. Commentators in countries with high immigration have pointed out that a population milestone may be reached by an immigrant rather than natural increase.

See also
U.S. and World Population Clock
World Population History
Estimates of historical world population

References

Milestones